Martin Weld Deyo (December 12, 1902 – October 20, 1951) was an American lawyer and politician from New York.

Life
He was born on December 12, 1902, in Binghamton, Broome County, New York, the son of Assemblyman Israel T. Deyo (1854–1953) and Edith Austin (Weld) Deyo (1863–1944). He attended Binghamton Central High School, and graduated from Amherst College in 1925. In 1928, he married Amy G. Sleeper (1902–1975). He graduated from Columbia Law School, was admitted to the bar in 1931, and practiced in Binghamton.

Deyo was a member of the New York State Assembly (Broome Co., 2nd D.) in 1933 and 1934; and a member of the New York State Senate (40th D.) in 1935 and 1936. In 1935, he introduced a bill in the Legislature to sterilize mentally defective people.

He was a delegate to the New York State Constitutional Convention of 1938.

He was a justice of the New York Supreme Court (6th D.) from 1940 until his death in 1951, and sat on the Appellate Division (3rd Dept.) from 1947 on.

He died on October 20, 1951; and was buried at the Floral Park Cemetery in Johnson City.

Sources

External links

 "Martin W. Deyo" at the Historical Society of the New York Courts [with portrait]

1902 births
1951 deaths
Republican Party New York (state) state senators
New York Supreme Court Justices
Politicians from Binghamton, New York
Amherst College alumni
Columbia Law School alumni
Republican Party members of the New York State Assembly
20th-century American judges
Lawyers from Binghamton, New York
20th-century American politicians
20th-century American lawyers